Merycodus is an extinct genus of the artiodactyl family Antilocapridae. Fossils of this genus have been found in the Santa Fe Group of New Mexico.

Taxonomy
Merycodus has had a confusing taxonomic history. The closely related Meryceros and Submeryceros are generally regarded as synonymous with Merycodus. One described species known as Merycodus grandis has now been reclassified as a species of Prosynthetoceras. Another former species, M. furcatus is now placed in Cosoryx.

Description

Merycodus had relatively short horn shafts with tines of  nearly equal size that were about as long as the shaft. Species traditionally included in Meryceros had horns that were generally larger and more laterally compressed.

References

Prehistoric even-toed ungulate genera
Prehistoric pronghorns
Miocene even-toed ungulates
Miocene mammals of North America